Fräulein is a 1958 romance film starring Dana Wynter and Mel Ferrer as two people caught up in World War II and the aftermath. It was also released as Fraulein in CinemaScope.

Plot
In Cologne near the end of World War II, American prisoner of war Foster MacLain (Mel Ferrer) escapes and is sheltered by Professor Julius Angermann (Ivan Triesault). Angermann's daughter Erika (Dana Wynter) is not so welcoming, but hides the American from the German soldiers looking for him. MacLain leaves when it is safe.

Not long afterwards, a bomb strikes the house, killing the professor. Erika goes to live in Berlin with her cousin Karl (Herbert Berghof). Karl has lodgers, Fritz and Berta Graubach (Luis van Rooten and Blandine Ebinger), who are outspoken supporters of the Nazi cause. When the Russians capture the city, Erika hides in the attic for fear of being raped. However, Berta betrays Erika's existence in order to save herself, and a drunken corporal starts up the stairs. Karl is killed trying to stop him. The Russian chases Erika out on the roof, but slips and falls to his death, and Erika is charged with his murder.

Colonel Dmitri Brikett (Theodore Bikel) is attracted to her and saves her life, though he expects a sexual reward. However, Erika manages to flee to the American-controlled sector of the city with the assistance of Lori (Dolores Michaels), a nightclub piano player. There, she runs into the Graubachs, who now claim they always opposed the Nazis. The Graubachs insist she come stay with them. She finds out later that they are running a brothel and want to employ her. She flees, but not before they have already registered her as a prostitute with the American authorities. They pursue her, but a kindly military policeman, Corporal Hanks (James Edwards), blocks them.

Meanwhile, MacLain searches for his wartime benefactors, finally finding Erika working in a nightclub. When he offers to help her, she asks him to find her fiancé Hugo (Helmut Dantine). MacLain uses his connections to locate Hugo and takes Erika to see him. However, she finds a very changed, embittered man – a crippled war veteran, who is living in a makeshift shelter with another woman, and who is not happy to see her with an American. Hugo asks Erica for the engagement ring back so he can buy an artificial arm to replace the one he lost in the war. She gives it to him and leaves.

As MacLain spends time with Erika, he falls in love with her. He asks her to marry him and move to the United States. She accepts, but when she goes to apply for a passport, she realizes that she will be turned down because of her registration as a whore. She is about to give up, but by chance, Corporal Hanks is the man processing the applications. Remembering the circumstances of their previous meeting, he erases her "occupation" and gives her the papers she needs.

Cast
 Dana Wynter as Erika Angermann 
 Mel Ferrer as Maj. Foster MacLain 
 Dolores Michaels as Lori the piano player 
 Margaret Hayes as Lt. Berdie Dubbin (as Maggie Hayes) 
 Theodore Bikel as Col. Dmitri Bucaron 
 Luis Van Rooten as Fritz Graubach 
 Helmut Dantine as Lt. Hugo Von Metzler 
 Herbert Berghof as Karl Angermann 
 James Edwards as Cpl. S. Hanks 
 Ivan Triesault as Prof. Julius Angermann 
 Blandine Ebinger as Frau Berta Graubach 
 Jack Kruschen as Sgt. Grischa
 John Banner as Ulick, German Health Dept.
 Dorothy Arnold as woman with Hugo (uncredited)

Reception
A.H. Weiler, writing for The New York Times, described the film as "a curiously episodic adventure whose parts are far more interesting than the whole drama." Of the stars, he wrote that "Miss Wynter is an appealing, if somewhat docile, heroine", while "the quality of docility is more than marked in Mr. Ferrer", who is "on occasion, restrained to the point of apathy."

Differences between the film and the novel

The character of Maj. Foster MacLain does not appear in the novel. While the film opens in Cologne, the novel begins in Dresden, and an early scene depicts the fire-bombing of the city by British and American planes in February 1945. The uncle with whom Erika takes refuge in Berlin is called Albert Heringsdorf in the novel. Apolitical in the film, he is a Communist in the novel, and welcomes the Soviet invasion. The depiction of what German women suffered during the taking of Berlin by Russian troops is more realistic in the novel; Erika is raped by Captain Dmitri, the Russian officer who appears in the film as her protector. The counterpart of the film's Lori, as Erika's friend, is a lesbian with anti-American opinions. Cpl. Hanks, the African-American soldier Erika encounters in the film, is a much more important character in the novel. He is called Si Hicks, and he and Erika fall in love and enjoy many months of happiness. Not understanding the racial situation in America, Erika begs Si to take her to his home, which leads to tragic consequences for Si. Erika does eventually marry an American, the successful businessman Foster Middendorf. He takes her back to New York, but they become bored with their comfortable existence, and he accepts an important diplomatic position in Berlin. When he and Erika return, she has a final encounter with Irmfried von Diesborn, the aristocratic German officer she was engaged to during the war. She recoils from his vision of a militarized Germany rising again.

References 

 Fräulein by James McGovern. New York: Crown. 1956.

External links
 
 
 
 

1958 films
1958 romantic drama films
American World War II films
Films directed by Henry Koster
Films scored by Daniele Amfitheatrof
Films set in Berlin
Films set in Cologne
20th Century Fox films
American romantic drama films
Films about prostitution in Germany
1950s English-language films
1950s American films